The Argentine Automobile Club building its national headquarters of ACA located in Palermo neighborhood in Buenos Aires. 

The building is designed in the Rationalist style by local architect Antonio U. Vilar and collaborators Alejandro Bustillo, was completed in 1942. on Buenos Aires' Avenida del Libertador. 

The building and its automobile museum are Palermo neighborhood landmarks.

Museum 
Notable cars in the museum.

Road Cars 

 Daimler 1892
 Benz 1897
 Cadillac 1904

Racing Cars 

 Ferrari 166 FL
 Brabham BT30
 Brabham BT36

Gallery

External links 

Museums in Buenos Aires
Automotive museums
Office buildings completed in 1942
Buildings and structures in Buenos Aires
1942 establishments in Argentina